Taurus is the name of several characters appearing in American comic books published by Marvel Comics.

Publication history

The Cornelius Van Lunt version of Taurus first appeared in Avengers #72 (Jan 1970) and was created by Roy Thomas and Sal Buscema.

Fictional character biography

Cornelius Van Lunt
 
Cornelius Van Lunt was a multimillionaire businessman and professional criminal mastermind. He was also the founder and financer of the original Zodiac cartel, chose its eleven other leaders, and succeeded Marcus Lassiter (the original Aries) as the Zodiac's overall leader. In the Zodiac's first mission, Taurus and the Zodiac were summoned by Nick Fury (disguised as Scorpio). Taurus battled the Avengers and then escaped. As Van Lunt he then attempted a hostile takeover of Stark Industries as part of his plan to make the Avengers his employees. As Van Lunt he had Will Talltrees's parents murdered to gain their land. He was opposed by Talltrees (as Red Wolf) and the Avengers, and was believed to have drowned. Later, the Zodiac schemed to kill all New York residents born under the sign of Gemini with the Star-Blazer weapon, but were foiled by the Avengers. Taurus defeated a rebellion within the Zodiac, but he was captured by the Avengers along with all the other Zodiac leaders, and his secret identity was exposed. While jailed, he allowed the Avengers to use his Star-Blazer weapon against the Star-Stalker.

Taurus later attempted to compete against the Maggia, who send the Taurus of the android Zodiac to wreck his headquarters. He hired Iron Man (James Rhodes), who defeated the android Taurus. Van Lunt then deduced this Iron Man's identity to be Rhodes, and sent Aries and Aquarius in an unsuccessful attempt to assassinate him. Taurus later witnessed the massacre of all the other human Zodiac leaders by Scorpio's android Zodiac. He aided the West Coast Avengers in defeating the android Zodiac, escaped, and attempted to enlist the Shroud in a new Zodiac. Taurus was ultimately killed in a plane crash just outside Los Angeles following a battle with Moon Knight.

It was revealed much later that the archetype for the Zodiac was a Great Wheel organized by Leonardo da Vinci in 1961 that included Nick Fury, Dum Dum Dugan, Jake Fury, Baron von Strucker, among other spymasters. Each was identified by his own sign of the Zodiac, and Van Lunt was designated Taurus.

Android Taurus
Scorpio (Jake Fury) constructed the android Zodiac members, although his plan was thwarted by the Defenders. The Maggia employed the android Taurus to wreck the human Taurus's headquarters; the android Taurus was defeated by Iron Man. Quicksilver employed the android Zodiac to attack the West Coast Avengers, but the Avengers defeated the Zodiac.

Led by Scorpio in a new android body, the android Zodiac massacred the human Zodiac, and took over their criminal operations. They battled the West Coast Avengers, but were rendered inert when they were transported to the dimension of the Brotherhood of the Ankh.

Ecliptic Taurus
This Taurus was a humanoid bull that was sprung from Ryker's Island by Scorpio. He was also a loud thug who is easily angered. Taurus was killed with the rest of the Zodiac by Weapon X.

Thanos' Taurus
The fourth Taurus is an unnamed man who was recruited to join Thanos' incarnation of the Zodiac. He and the other Zodiac members perish when Thanos abandons them on the self-destructing Helicarrier where Cancer was the only survivor.

Powers and abilities
Taurus wore a costume that he designed, of synthetic stretch fabric and leather, reinforced with kevlar. The costume came with an armored helmet with horns constructed of an unknown hard material, making them formidable weapons. His personal fighting style involved bull-like charges at opponents with his lowered horns. He also controls the Zodiac's "Star-Blazer" energy weapons invented by Darren Bentley; these included the Star-Blazer handgun which fired intense blasts of stellar energy, and the Star-Blazer cannon which was a larger, more powerful version of the handgun. Cornelius van Lunt was a normal human with no superhuman powers. He had a degree in business administration and was a skilled businessman, organizer, and strategist. He was also an amateur astrologer with extensive knowledge of astrology.

In its original form, the android Taurus had retractable horns mounted on its arms and attached to cables so that it can be fired at opponents. It also possessed internal sensors enabling it to detect heat. In its second form, the android Taurus had enhanced strength and was immune to energy blasts.

The Ecliptic version of Taurus had superhuman strength and carried the Zodiac teleportation device.

Thanos' Taurus wears a special suit given to him by Thanos which enables him to possess super-strength and transform into a minotaur-like form.

Other media
 Taurus appears in The Avengers: United They Stand, voiced by Gerry Mendicino. This version is a Minotaur-like alien and the leader of Zodiac who can temporarily take on a human form with the alias of Cornelius van Lunt.
 Taurus appears in the Marvel Anime: Iron Man episode "A Twist of Memory, a Turn of the Mind". This version is a large bull-like mech utilized by Zodiac and controlled by a disabled racecar driver named Kawashima (voiced by Shuuhei Sakaguchi in the Japanese version and by Roger Craig Smith in the English dub), who was offered cybernetic enhancements that would allow him to race again, in return for killing Iron Man. Kawashima nearly succeeds until Wolverine intervenes. When the Taurus mech begins to take over Kawashima, Iron Man and Wolverine destroy it and rescue him.
 Taurus-inspired foot soldiers appear in Ultimate Spider-Man as members of Zodiac.

References

External links
 Taurus at Marvel.com
 
 Android Taurus at Marvel Appendix

Characters created by Roy Thomas
Characters created by Sal Buscema
Comics characters introduced in 1970
Fictional businesspeople
Fictional henchmen
Marvel Comics characters with superhuman strength
Marvel Comics robots
Marvel Comics supervillains